Moscow City Duma District 43 is one of 45 constituencies in Moscow City Duma. The constituency covers western parts of Central Moscow. District 43 was created in 2013, after Moscow City Duma had been expanded from 35 to 45 seats. Government of Russia is located within district's boundaries.

Members elected

Election results

2014

|-
! colspan=2 style="background-color:#E9E9E9;text-align:left;vertical-align:top;" |Candidate
! style="background-color:#E9E9E9;text-align:left;vertical-align:top;" |Party
! style="background-color:#E9E9E9;text-align:right;" |Votes
! style="background-color:#E9E9E9;text-align:right;" |%
|-
|style="background-color:"|
|align=left|Vera Shastina
|align=left|United Russia
|
|28.44%
|-
|style="background-color:"|
|align=left|Leonid Yarmolnik
|align=left|Civic Platform
|
|27.43%
|-
|style="background-color:"|
|align=left|Tatyana Denisenko
|align=left|Communist Party
|
|21.07%
|-
|style="background-color:"|
|align=left|Sergey Ivanenko
|align=left|Yabloko
|
|11.34%
|-
|style="background-color:"|
|align=left|Arina Iksanova
|align=left|A Just Russia
|
|6.24%
|-
|style="background-color:"|
|align=left|Yury Kravchenko
|align=left|Liberal Democratic Party
|
|3.05%
|-
| colspan="5" style="background-color:#E9E9E9;"|
|- style="font-weight:bold"
| colspan="3" style="text-align:left;" | Total
| 
| 100%
|-
| colspan="5" style="background-color:#E9E9E9;"|
|- style="font-weight:bold"
| colspan="4" |Source:
|
|}

2019

|-
! colspan=2 style="background-color:#E9E9E9;text-align:left;vertical-align:top;" |Candidate
! style="background-color:#E9E9E9;text-align:left;vertical-align:top;" |Party
! style="background-color:#E9E9E9;text-align:right;" |Votes
! style="background-color:#E9E9E9;text-align:right;" |%
|-
|style="background-color:"|
|align=left|Sergey Mitrokhin
|align=left|Yabloko
|
|44.70%
|-
|style="background-color:"|
|align=left|Dmitry Koshlakov-Krestovsky
|align=left|Liberal Democratic Party
|
|20.05%
|-
|style="background-color:"|
|align=left|Roman Klimentyev
|align=left|Communist Party
|
|18.11%
|-
|style="background-color:"|
|align=left|Yevgeny Borovik
|align=left|A Just Russia
|
|13.73%
|-
| colspan="5" style="background-color:#E9E9E9;"|
|- style="font-weight:bold"
| colspan="3" style="text-align:left;" | Total
| 
| 100%
|-
| colspan="5" style="background-color:#E9E9E9;"|
|- style="font-weight:bold"
| colspan="4" |Source:
|
|}

References

Moscow City Duma districts